Rs6294, also called G294A, is a gene variation—a single nucleotide polymorphism (SNP)— in the HTR1A gene.

C(-1019)G (rs6295) is another SNP in the HTR1A gene.

References
 

SNPs on chromosome 5